A craniotomy is a surgical operation in which a bone flap is temporarily removed from the skull to access the brain. Craniotomies are often critical operations, performed on patients who are suffering from brain lesions, such as tumors, blood clots, removal of foreign bodies such as bullets, or traumatic brain injury (TBI), and can also allow doctors to surgically implant devices, such as deep brain stimulators for the treatment of Parkinson's disease, epilepsy, and cerebellar tremor. The procedure is also used in epilepsy surgery to remove the parts of the brain that are causing epilepsy.

Craniotomy is distinguished from craniectomy (in which the skull flap is not immediately replaced, allowing the brain to swell, thus reducing intracranial pressure) and from trepanation, the creation of a burr hole through the cranium in to the dura mater.

Procedure

Human craniotomy is usually performed under general anesthesia but can be also done with the patient awake using a local anaesthetic; the procedure, typically, does not involve significant discomfort for the patient. In general, a craniotomy will be preceded by an MRI scan which provides an image of the brain that the surgeon uses to plan the precise location for bone removal and the appropriate angle of access to the relevant brain areas.  The amount of skull that needs to be removed depends on the type of surgery being performed. The bone flap is mostly removed with the help of a cranial drill and a craniotome, then replaced using titanium plates and screws or another form of fixation (wire, suture, etc.) after completion of the surgical procedure.  In the event the host bone does not accept its replacement an artificial piece of skull, often made of PEEK, is substituted.  (The PEEK appliance is routinely modeled by a CNC machine capable of accepting a high resolution MRI computer file in order to provide a very close fit, in an effort to minimize fitment issues, and therefore minimizing the duration of the cranial surgery.)

Complications

Bacterial meningitis or viral meningitis occurs in about 0.8 to 1.5% of individuals undergoing craniotomy. Postcraniotomy pain is frequent and moderate to severe in nature. This pain has been controlled through the use of scalp infiltrations, nerve scalp blocks, parecoxib, and morphine, morphine being the most effective in providing analgesia.

According to the Journal of Neurosurgery, Infections in patients undergoing craniotomy: risk factors associated with post-craniotomy meningitis, their clinical studies indicated that "the risk for meningitis was independently associated with perioperative steroid use and ventricular drainage".

Within the 334 procedures that they had conducted from males and females, their results concluded that traumatic brain injuries were the predominant causes of bacterial meningitis.

At least 40% of patients became susceptible to at least one infection, creating more interconnected risk factors along the way. From the Infectious Diseases Clinic Erasme Hospital, there had been reports of infections initially beginning from either the time of surgery, skin intrusion, hematogenous seeding, or retrograde infections.

Cerebrospinal fluid shunt (CSF) associates with the risk of meningitis due to the following factors: pre-shunt associated infections, post-operative CSF leakage, lack of experience from the neurosurgeon, premature birth/young age, advanced age, shunt revisions for dysfunction, and neuroendoscopes.

The way shunts are operated on each patient relies heavily on the cleanliness of the site. Once bacteria penetrates the area of a CSF, the procedure becomes more complicated.

The skin is especially necessary to address because it is an external organ. Scratching the incision site can easily create an infection due to there being no barrier between the open air and wound.

Aside from scratching, decubitus ulcer and tissues near the shunt site are also leading pathways for infection susceptibility.

It is also common to give patients seven days of anti-seizure medications post operatively. Traditionally this has been phenytoin, but now is increasingly levetiracetam as it has a lower risk of drug-drug interactions.

See also

 Decompressive craniectomy
 Trepanning

References

External links

Neurosurgical procedures